"SuperJam" could refer to:

102 JAMZ SuperJam
SuperJam, a music event organised by British charity The Sunflower Jam.